Ceratinostoma is a genus of dung flies in the family Scathophagidae. There is at least one described species in Ceratinostoma, C. ostiorum.

References

Further reading

 

Scathophagidae
Articles created by Qbugbot
Schizophora genera